This is a list of towns in Zacatecas in Mexico.

A 
Alameda Juárez (Santa Rosa)
Apizolaya
Apozol
Atolinga

B 
Benito Juárez
Buenavista

C 
Cañitas de Felipe Pescador
Casa de Cerros
Chalchihuites
Chichimequilla
Ciudad Garcia
Coapas
Concepción del Oro

E 
El Carnero
El Fuerte
El Plateado de Joaquín Amaro
El Teul de Gonzalez Ortega
El Visitador
Estancia de Animas (La Estancia)
El Tepetate

F 
Fresnillo
Florencia de Benito Juárez
El Ruso

G 
Guadalupe

H 
Huanusco
Huitzila

J 
Jalpa
Jerez
Juan Aldama
Juchipila
Jarillas

L 
La Cofradia Jalpa
La Estrella
La Quemada
Lazaro Cardenas
Loreto
Los Indios
Luis Moya
Laguna Grande
Lobatos
Los Aparicio, Zacatecas
Los Griegos , Zacatecas

M 
Mezquital del Oro
Miguel Auza
Milpillas de Allende
Milpillas de la Sierra
Momax
Moyahua de Estrada
Monte Escobedo

N 
Nieves
Nochistlan
Norias
Maria de la torre

O 
Ojitos de Santa Lucia
Ojocaliente

P 
General Panfilo Natera a.k.a. La Blanca
Paunco
Pinos
Plateros

R 
Rio Grande
Rio Florido (Fresnillo)

S 
Sain Alto
San José de Lourdes
San Juan de Mesquital
San Martin
Santiaguillo
Santo Santiago
Sombrerete
Susticacán

T 
Tabasco
Tacoaleche
Tepechitlán
Tepetongo
Tlachichila
Tlaltenango de Sánchez Román
Tayahua
Tenanguillo
Trinidad Garcia De La Cadena

V 
Valparaíso
Veinte de Noviembre
Villanueva
Villa González Ortega
Villa de Cos

Z 
Zapoqui
Zacatecas

Zacatecas